The  St. John's Edge  are an inactive Canadian professional basketball team based in St. John's, Newfoundland and Labrador, and compete in the National Basketball League of Canada. From 2017 to 2020, they played home games at Mile One Centre. They were given a leave of absence from the league in 2021 due to not having a suitable home arena after not being given a new lease for Mile One Centre.

History
On September 18, 2017, the city of St. John's approved the team to play at Mile One Centre. The team is owned by Atlantic Sport Enterprises Ltd, then consisting of John Graham with Irwin Simon and Robert Sabbagh. On September 28, 2017, St. John's named Jeff Dunlap head coach and Doug Plumb assistant coach. Due to a couple of teams in Ontario dropping out for the season causing a divisional imbalance and the lateness in the addition of the Edge, the team played its inaugural season as a member of the Central Division with the teams from Ontario.

The Edge signed Newfoundland native Carl English, who then finished second in the league in points per game and was named league MVP for the 2017–18 season. The Edge finished the 2017–18 season second in the division and advanced to the division finals in the playoffs before losing to eventual league champions London Lightning. Head coach and general manager Jeff Dunlap departed after the season to take an assistant coach job at California State University, Northridge and was replaced by assistant Doug Plumb. In June 2018, Carl English took over general manager duties for the Edge, while remaining a player on the team.

Prior to the 2018–19 season, the NBL Canada added another team in Ontario called the Sudbury Five, but lost another in the Niagara River Lions, creating another divisional imbalance and keeping the Edge in the Central Division. The league decided to play as a single table for the regular season to ease the Edge's travel, but still used the team's overall record in the divisional standings for playoff qualification. At the start of the season, head coach Doug Plumb was suspended two games for tampering, and was temporarily replaced by assistant Steven Marcus. On March 19, 2019, Plumb resigned and Marcus was again named the interim head coach. Marcus was retained as head coach for the 2019–20 season. The Edge were placed in the Atlantic Division for the 2019–20 season after the division lost teams in Cape Breton and Saint John, but the season was curtailed by the onset of the COVID-19 pandemic while the Edge were in second place in their division and no playoffs were held. The league did not hold a 2020–21 season due to the ongoing restrictions during the pandemic.

On July 15, 2021, the Edge were unable to secure a lease with St. John's Sports and Entertainment (SJSE), the group that owns Mile One Centre, and were announced as not returning to the venue for the 2022 season. The Edge's ownership had been negotiating with the arena alongside Deacon Sports and Entertainment (DSE), the majority owner of the arena's hockey tenant Newfoundland Growlers, where DSE would have taken over as primary owner of the Edge upon the lease renewal. DSE chose not to sign the lease as SJSE had included terms that the Edge's debts for the installation of a 360 LED board must be rectified or taken on by DSE. SJSE instead awarded a lease to an outside ownership group, 2001 Investments Limited, and their American Basketball Association franchise. On September 10, the sale of the Edge to DSE was approved by the league if an arena deal could be settled. DSE stated they were committed to keeping the Edge in the region, but no home arena was announced at the time. The Growlers were also evicted from the arena in October 2021 leading an on-going lease dispute between SJSE and DSE. The Edge were granted a leave of absence by the league in November 2021 in order to obtain a new lease and the sale of the team to DSE was not finalized. After the deal for the Edge fell through, DSE instead struck a deal to operate a new basketball team in the Canadian Elite Basketball League, which they also named the Newfoundland Growlers. The team folded shortly after the conclusion of their only season in the CEBL.

Personnel

Current roster 

|

Franchise leaders
Statistics (regular season) as of the end of the 2017–18 season

Notable players 

 Ransford Brempong (2018)
 Rashaun Broadus (2017–2018)
 Junior Cadougan (2018–present)
 Glen Davis (2018–2019)
 Carl English (2017–2019 )
 Grandy Glaze (2017–2018)
 Charles Hinkle (2017–2018)
 Alex Johnson (2017–2018)
 Chadrack Lufile (2018)
 Ryan Reid (2018)
 Satnam Singh (2018–2019)

Season-by-season record
Cited from NBLCanada.ca

References

External links
 

 
National Basketball League of Canada teams
Sport in St. John's, Newfoundland and Labrador